Lesley-Ann Brandt is a South African Actress (born 2 December 1981) best known for the role of Mazikeen on the television series Lucifer.

Early life
Born in Cape Town, South Africa, Brandt is Cape Coloured of Indian, German, Dutch, and Spanish descent. She is a fluent Afrikaans speaker and lists yoga, hockey, and baseball among her interests. In South Africa, she played competitive field hockey.

In 1999, Brandt immigrated to Auckland, New Zealand, with her parents and her younger brother Brian Brandt. Brandt started work in retail sales in Auckland before securing work as an information technology recruitment consultant. Following some modelling work, she was cast in a number of New Zealand television advertisements. She studied acting and was trained in the Meisner technique in 2008.

Career
Brandt's first significant acting role was in the New Zealand television series Diplomatic Immunity. Brandt has appeared in guest roles on the New Zealand hospital soap opera, Shortland Street, and This Is Not My Life, a science fiction series set in the 2020s in the fictional town of Waimoana.

Brandt had a role as Naevia in the first season Spartacus: Blood and Sand and the prequel miniseries Spartacus: Gods of the Arena. She originally auditioned for the role of Sura but auditioned for the role of Naevia instead. Brandt did not return due to production delays following the death of Andy Whitfield, and she was replaced by Cynthia Addai-Robinson. Brandt had a role in the New Zealand coming-of-age feature film The Hopes & Dreams of Gazza Snell about the victim of a kart racing accident, was filmed in Howick, a suburb of East Auckland.

Brandt guest starred in the CSI: NY episodes "Smooth Criminal" and "Food for Thought". Brandt was featured in the film InSight in which she plays nurse Valerie Khoury. In May 2010, Brandt guest starred on Legend of the Seeker, another Rob Tapert/Sam Raimi production filmed in New Zealand. She appeared in the second-season finale "Tears" in the role of Sister Thea. In 2011, she guest appeared in TNT's Memphis Beat, which was followed by a lead role as Cassie in Syfy's highest rated original feature for 2011, Zombie Apocalypse, which also starred Ving Rhames and Taryn Manning. She appeared in the feature film Drift with Sam Worthington and Xavier Samuel, and Duke starring CSI: NY star Carmine Giovinazzo.

In 2013, she had a recurring role in the third season of Single Ladies as Naomi Cox. In 2014, she guest starred as Larissa Diaz/Copperhead on Gotham, and appeared as the recurring character Lamia in The Librarians. In 2015, she won the role of Maze in the FOX television series Lucifer. She replaced actress Lina Esco and Brandt had reportedly tested for the role and was reconsidered afterward.

Brandt is based in Los Angeles.

Personal life

Brandt married her boyfriend of six years, actor Chris Payne Gilbert, in 2015. The couple's first child, son Kingston Payne Brandt-Gilbert, was born in July 2017.

Filmography

Film

Television

Music videos

Podcasts

References

External links
 
 
 Lesley-Ann Brandt answers fan questions - February 2011

1981 births
Living people
Actresses from Cape Town
South African people of German descent
South African people of Indian descent
South African people of Dutch descent
South African people of Spanish descent
South African television actresses
South African film actresses
20th-century South African actresses
21st-century South African actresses
South African emigrants to New Zealand
Cape Coloureds